The La Barge Bluffs Petroglyphs is a historic site which was listed on the National Register of Historic Places in 2014.

The site includes nine panels of petroglyphs along  of the Green River.  The panels show "ancient anthropomorphic and zoomorphic figures, narrative battle and dance scenes and depictions of two locomotives."  All of the panels have been affected negatively by graffiti, bullets, and/or other human-caused or natural damage.

References

Archaeological sites on the National Register of Historic Places in Wyoming
Lincoln County, Wyoming
Petroglyphs
Historic districts in Wyoming